The Three Rivers Athletic Conference was a short-lived conference based in Southern Indiana, not to be confused with the Three Rivers Conference in northern Indiana, which still exists. The five schools that made the conference were very small, far-flung schools that were unable to find a home in closer leagues for various reasons. The league folded in 1989 due to travel concerns, with all the members becoming independent. New Harmony closed in 2012, while Cannelton and Medora joined the Southern Roads Conference in 2018, while Christian Academy of Indiana (formerly Graceland Christian) and Evansville Day remain independent.

Members

References

Resources 
 Graceland Christian All-Time Results

Indiana high school athletic conferences
High school sports conferences and leagues in the United States
Indiana High School Athletic Association disestablished conferences